The Shooting Federation of the Islamic Republic of Iran (English abbreviation: IRISSF and International Code: IRI) is the location of the Shooting Sports Office in Iran. The federation is responsible for sending teams and individuals to the Olympics for shooting sports.

National teams 
Fixed Target:
 Air Rifle National Shooting Teams
 Air Pistol National Shooting Teams

Clay pigeon shooting:

 Trap National Shooting Teams
 Skeet National Shooting Teams

References 

Shooting sports organizations
Sports governing bodies in Iran